Chicken is a 2015 British drama film directed by Joe Stephenson. It is based on the play of the same name by Freddie Machin.

Plot 
The film follows Richard (Scott Chambers), a fifteen-year-old boy with learning difficulties who lives in a shabby caravan with his older brother, Polly.  Life for the siblings is harsh, with the engaging, nature-loving teenager yearning for stability. Richard frequently finds himself on the wrong side of Polly's destructive, often violent moods.

Richard finds it easier to communicate with animals – none more so than his beloved hen, Fiona.  He forms a strong friendship with rebellious seventeen-year-old Annabel, whose family have recently acquired the farmland on which the brothers live. A growing conflict with the new landowners will lead to a situation that severely tests Richard's natural optimism, as the world of privilege collides with the brothers' precarious, marginalized existence.

In recent adaptations of the film, they removed the section of the film where the disabled kid ate a dead chicken

Cast 
 Scott Chambers as Richard
 Morgan Watkins as Polly
 Yasmin Paige as Annabell
 Kirsty Besterman as Mrs. Rickson
 Stuart Keil as Mr. Rickson
 Freddie Machin as Scrap Yard Owner
 Gina Bramhill as Tara
 Alf Raines as Pub Landlord
 Johnny Vercoutre as Pub Customer
 Adrian Bouchet as Bill
 Rose Williams as Lil
 Ben Mars as Kevin
 Michael Culkin as McClint
 Danny Steele as Electrician
 Alex Murphy as Bloodied Man

Release 
Chicken had its world premiere on 27 June 2015 Edinburgh International Film Festival. The film had its international premiere in competition at the 2015 Busan International Film Festival, followed by screenings at the New Hampshire International Film Festival, Giffoni International Film Festival, Cine A La Vista International Film Festival, Tallinn Black Nights Film Festival, Schlingel International Film Festival and Dublin International Film Festival. It eventually received a limited theatrical release in the UK on 20 May 2016.

It was then acquired by MUBI UK, and had its British TV premiere on FilmFour April 2017. It received its DVD and Blu-ray release by Network on 18 September 2017.

Reception

Critical reception 
Chicken received positive reviews and holds a 100% "Certified Fresh" rating on Rotten Tomatoes based on 12 critic reviews. Leslie Felperin of The Guardian gave the film 3/5 stars and said "first-time director Joe Stephenson elicits lively, empathic performances from his small cast." Mark Kermode rated the film at four out of five stars stating that Scott Chambers' performance is "superb". Anna Smith of Empire magazine gave the film a rating of four stars, responding that the film is "an enjoyable, involving British Drama with and impressive turn from newcomer Scott Chambers. With a three-star rating from Cath Clarke of Time Out, she commented that Chicken is "an impressively acted British Drama about a young man with learning difficulties." CineVue praised the film and mentioned that it is "the sort of British indie which restores faith in cinema".

Accolades 
 Grand Jury Award for Narrative Feature — Joe Stephenson (New Hampshire Film Festival 2015)
 Silver Griffoni Award for Best Film - Generation 18+ (2nd Prize) — Joe Stephenson & B Good Picture Company (Giffoni Film Festival 2016)
 Award for Best Film — Chicken (Cine A La Vista International Film Festival 2016)
 Scott Chamber's performance as Richard got a Special Critic's Circle mention (Dublin International Film Festival 2016)
 The film was shortlisted for Best Director (Joe Stephenson) and Best Newcomer (Scott Chambers) by the British Independent Film Awards.

References

External links 
 
 

2015 films
2015 drama films
British drama films
British independent films
English films
Films set in England
Films about intellectual disability
Films about friendship
Incest in film
2010s English-language films
2010s British films